The statue of Charlie Chaplin in Leicester Square, London, is a work of 1979 by the sculptor John Doubleday. It portrays the actor, comedian and filmmaker in his best-known role, as The Tramp.

A memorial to Chaplin in the city of his birth was proposed on 25 December 1977, soon after Chaplin's death, by Illtyd Harrington, the leader of the opposition in the Greater London Council. Initial plans for a memorial in the Elephant and Castle, in South London where Chaplin spent his early years, were dropped and instead Leicester Square, at the centre of London's entertainment district, became the preferred location for the work.

The bronze statue was first unveiled on 16 April 1981 (the 92nd anniversary of Chaplin's birth) at its original site, on the south-western corner of the square, by the actor Sir Ralph Richardson. An inscription on the plinth read . The following year a slightly modified version was erected in the Swiss town of Vevey, which had been Chaplin's home from 1952 until his death. Following a refurbishment of Leicester Square in 1989–1992, the statue was moved to a site north of the statue of William Shakespeare, the square's centrepiece.

In a later refurbishment of 2010–2012 Chaplin's statue was removed altogether, together with busts of William Hogarth, John Hunter, Sir Isaac Newton and Sir Joshua Reynolds. The statue was installed in a nearby street, Leicester Place, in 2013. This was in order to prevent damage to the sculpture during improvement works. In 2016 it returned to Leicester Square and was re-unveiled on Chaplin's birthday.

See also
 Scenes in the Square, a sculptural trail with a cinematic theme installed in Leicester Square in 2020

References

External links
 

1979 establishments in the United Kingdom
1979 sculptures
Bronze sculptures in the United Kingdom
Cultural depictions of Charlie Chaplin
Monuments and memorials in London
Outdoor sculptures in London
Chaplin, Charlie
Chaplin, Charlie
Portraits of actors